Reedson is an unincorporated community on Shepherdstown Pike (West Virginia Route 230) in Jefferson County, West Virginia, United States.  Reedson lies between Uvilla to its North, and Halltown to its South.

References

Unincorporated communities in Jefferson County, West Virginia
Unincorporated communities in West Virginia